Since the Iranian Revolution in 1979, the Islamic Republic of Iran has been embroiled in tense relations with the United States and its allies. Following the overthrow of the American-backed Shah and a hostage crisis, both countries severed relations. Since then, both countries have been involved in numerous direct confrontations, diplomatic incidents, and proxy wars throughout the Middle East, which has caused the tense relation between the two to be called an 'international crisis'. Both countries have often accused each other of breaking international law on several occasions. The U.S. has often accused Iran of sponsoring terrorism and of illegally maintaining a nuclear program, as well as using strong rhetoric against Israel, of which Iran has questioned its legitimacy and its right to exist. Meanwhile, Iran has often accused the U.S. of human rights violations and of meddling within their affairs, especially within the Iranian Democracy Movement.

Both countries have been embroiled in conflicts in Syria, Iraq, Yemen, and Afghanistan, supporting opposite sides and conducting operations against each other. Both countries have also to the brink of war in situations as in the Tanker War and the Persian Gulf Crisis, both of which exacerbated tensions between the two. This has caused the United States and Israel to refuse to exclude the use of force to stop Iran, although they have always stressed that they consider the use of force as a last resort.

As a result of tensions the United States has taken the opportunity to broker negotiations and alliances between Israel and Arab States, some of which have viewed Iran with antagonistic ambitions. These countries have similar views to Iran and have often cooperated with each other to achieve their goals.

Nuclear controversy

Diplomatic activity linked to Iranian nuclear program

The Iranian nuclear program has been controversial as, although the development of a civilian nuclear power program, including enrichment activities, is explicitly allowed under the terms of the Nuclear Non-Proliferation Treaty (NPT), there have been allegations that Iran has been illicitly pursuing a nuclear weapons program, in violation of the NPT (see Iran and weapons of mass destruction).

Under the leadership of the United States and of the European Union, the international community has requested the end of enrichment activities in Iran. The 118 member states of the Non-Aligned Movement however have backed Iran's right to "acquire peaceful nuclear technology".

This diplomatic effort culminated in United Nations Security Council Resolution 1737, adopted (after a significant amount of diplomatic efforts) with the approval of both China and Russia (which held veto power). This resolution imposes specific, but light, economic sanctions solely linked to Iran's nuclear program.

The resolution mentions that in the event that "Iran has not complied with this resolution, [the security council will] adopt further appropriate measures under Article 41 of Chapter VII of the Charter of the United Nations to persuade Iran to comply with this resolution and the requirements of the IAEA, and underlines that further decisions will be required should such additional measures be necessary." According to the resolution, Iran must comply within 60 days, i.e. before 20 February 2007.

Iran has strongly rejected this resolution. Iran's parliament passed a bill on 27 December 2006 obliging the government to "revise" its cooperation with the International Atomic Energy Agency and to accelerate its drive to master nuclear technology in a reaction to the U.N. resolution. The bill gave President Mahmoud Ahmadinejad's government a free hand to adopt a tougher line against the IAEA, including ending its inspections of Iran's atomic facilities.

On March 2, 2007, six key nations, including the 5 permanent members of the UN Security Council, which hold veto power, have agreed to pass a new resolution to impose tougher sanctions on Iran regarding its nuclear issue at the United Nations Security Council, French Foreign Minister Philippe Douste-Blazy said.

In March 2007, Russia announced that construction of a nuclear reactor would be delayed at least two months because Iran had failed to make monthly payments since January. It said the delay could cause "irreversible" damage to the project. Because of the delay, Russia also indefinitely put off the delivery of enriched uranium fuel it had promised to provide Iran in March. Iran, which denied falling behind in payments, was furious, convinced Russia was pressuring the country to bend to the U.N. Security Council, which has placed sanctions against it for refusing to suspend uranium enrichment. The pattern of Russia's behavior has strengthened Iran's determination to obtain the full technology to build nuclear power plants and end its dependence because they say Russia has never been and will never be a reliable partner.

Accusation of hypocrisy and double standards by Iran toward the West

On February 20, 2007, before the expiration of the United Nations Security Council deadline asking Iran to suspend uraninium enrichment, Ali Larijani, Iran's Head of the National Security Council, warned that “double standards will severely damage the credibility of international bodies“.
“I think certain countries are seeking adventure on Iran’s nuclear case. You know that some countries until now have not signed the NPT, but are conducting nuclear activities,“ he said, regretting that no action has been taken against such countries while the UN Security Council has passed a resolution against Iran.

On March 18, 2007, Iran, under fire from Western powers over its atomic program, criticized Britain's plans to renew its nuclear arsenal as a "serious setback" to international disarmament efforts. Britain's parliament backed Prime Minister Tony Blair's plans to renew the country's Trident missile nuclear weapons system.

"Britain does not have the right to question others when they're not complying with their obligations" referring to the obligation by the U.K., United States, Russia and France to disarm under the NPT accord and "It is very unfortunate that the UK, which is always calling for non-proliferation not only has not given up the weapons but has taken a serious step toward further development of nuclear weapons," Iran's envoy to the International Atomic Energy Agency, told a conference examining the Trident decision.

In a Question and Answer session following his address to Columbia University on September 24, 2007, the Iranian President remarked: "I think the politicians who are after atomic bombs, or testing them, making them, politically they are backward, retarded."

Opposition inside Iran to nuclear energy policy

On 20 February 2007, a small radical reformist political party, the Islamic Revolutionary Mujahadin Organisation, complained that Iran's drive to produce nuclear energy has endangered national security, the national interest and the destiny of the Iranian people.

On 26 February 2007, the conservative daily Resalat chided Ahmadinejad, saying "neither weakness nor unnecessarily offensive language is acceptable in foreign policy."

Statements by Iranian leaders against Israel

Iranian leaders have made vehement declarations against Israel.  Ahmadinejad was widely reported as calling for Israel to be "wiped off the map." However, this translation is disputed, and some have considered it a psyop (See: Translation of phrase "wiped off the map"). A call for Israel's destruction is also attributed to Ayatollah Khomeini, the political leader of the 1979 Islamic Revolution., and Iranian military parades featured ballistic missiles adorned with slogans such as 'Israel must be uprooted and erased from history'.

The Iranian government has stressed they did not call for an attack on Israel. Rather, they wish to allow Palestinian refugees to return to Palestine, whereupon all inhabitants will vote on its political future. These "clarifications" are seen in Israel as a diplomatic smokescreen.

"For many long years, we have followed Iran's efforts to acquire nuclear weapons, in the guise of a civilian nuclear program," said Prime Minister of Israel Ehud Olmert.

In November 2003, Israel's defence minister Shaul Mofaz has made what sources have described as a warning of "unprecedented severity." Mofaz set out his government's position last week during a visit to the United States stating that "under no circumstances would Israel be able to tolerate nuclear weapons in Iranian possession".

Support of "Islamism"
The Islamic Republic funds and arms militant groups like Hezbollah, Hamas, and Islamic Jihad. The U.S. State Department claims this makes Iran an active sponsor of terrorism. Iran was added in 1984 on the U.S. list of state sponsors of international terrorism. According to the State Department, Iran "continued to provide Lebanese Hezbollah and the Palestinian rejectionist groups—notably Hamas, the Palestine Islamic Jihad, and the PFLP-GC—with varying amounts of funding, safe haven, training, and weapons. It also encouraged Hezbollah and the rejectionist Palestinian groups to coordinate their planning and to escalate their activities."

Iranian activity in Iraq
Iran has taken an active role in Iraq. Talks between the two nations (Iran and Iraq) have been successful, with Iran even going so far as to build a major Iranian Bank branch inside Iraq. Iran stresses that it supports the government of Iraq. Indeed, the main party that supports the Iraqi government and the US coalition, SCIRI, is also close to Iran.  Its leader, Abdul Aziz al-Hakim, who has been invited at the White House, was a refugee in Iran when Saddam Hussein was the leader of Iraq. On 21 February 2007, his own son, coming from Iran with armed guards, was arrested by US forces and later released with excuses by US forces.

The US have, however, contended that Iran supports some Shiite militias that are alleged to be against the Iraq government, especially the Mahdi army of Muqtada al-Sadr.  According to the Iranian ambassador to Iraq, the US is currently detaining 6 Iranian diplomats and 30 Iranian nationals in Iraq. This number has neither been confirmed nor denied by US officials. On February 28, 2007, the United States however agreed to participate to an international conference to be called by the government of Iraq to discuss Iraq security crisis, where the government of Iran is also invited. Secretary of State Condoleezza Rice said that the United States would join the meeting and that Washington supported the Iraqi government's invitation to Iran and Syria.

Iranian officials arrested by US forces in Baghdad

On December 25, 2006, the United States arrested at least four senior military officials on their visit to Baghdad. It has been mentioned that the Iranians have been arrested after US soldiers raided the compound of Shiite leader Abdul Aziz al-Hakim, leader of the influential Shiite Supreme Council for Islamic Revolution in Iraq (SCIRI). President of Iraq Talabani, a strong US ally, has asked for their release. Hiwa Othman, Talabani's media adviser, told Reuters: "The president is unhappy. He is talking to the Americans about it as we speak." Othman said the Iranian diplomats came to Iraq at the invitation of the Iraqi leader but he was not aware if they had met with him."The invitation was within the framework of an agreement between Iran and Iraq to improve the security situation." Finally, it seems that they have been released on 30 December. One of the commanders, identified by officials simply as Chizari, was the third-highest-ranking official of the Iranian Revolutionary Guards' al-Quds Brigade, the unit most active in aiding, arming and training groups outside Iran, including Hezbollah and Islamic Jihad, U.S. officials said.

On 4 January 2007, the BBC's flagship political programme Newsnight cited British authorities in
Iraq as saying that while the arrests produced highly important intelligence information, there was no "smoking gun" about weapons supplies or attacks. "There was discussion of whether the Maliki government would succeed, who should be in which ministerial jobs... It was a very significant meeting," one official said. The BBC said US sensitivity to the matter comes from discovering evidence that Iran is trying to turn the situation in Iraq to its advantage, to the extent of trying to influence the make-up of the Baghdad government.

Attack by US forces on an Iranian consulate in Irbil

Five United States helicopters landed on the roof of the consulate in the northern city of Irbil. American soldiers broke down the doors, detained five people and took away papers and computers. The raid came as American leaders step up their rhetoric against Iran. U.S. Defense Secretary Robert Gates said Tehran is arming the insurgents in Iraq.

An Iranian foreign ministry official in a meeting with the Iraqi ambassador to Tehran here on Friday stressed that Baghdad should not allow the United States to interfere in Iran-Iraq relations. "We expect the Iraqi government to take immediate measures to set the aforesaid individuals free and to condemn the U.S. troopers for the measure," the official stressed. For his part, Iraqi ambassador to Tehran expressed regret over the incident and pledged to pursue the case through the officials of his country. According to Associated Press, The Iraqi foreign minister called Sunday 14 January for the release of five Iranians detained by U.S. forces in what he said was a legitimate mission in northern Iraq.

US accusation of supporting attacks on American troops

In his January 10, 2007, address to the nation, President Bush asserted that succeeding in Iraq begins with addressing Iran and Syria. "Iran is providing material support for attacks on American troops. We will disrupt the attacks on our forces. We'll interrupt the flow of support from Iran and Syria. And we will seek out and destroy the networks providing advanced weaponry and training to our enemies in Iraq," Bush said.

During the following weeks, Bush's statements were criticized for preparing the US for an attack on Iran without Congressional approval. His actions with regards to Iran were also called "offensive and provocative."

On 2 February 2007, Bush administration officials acknowledged that they had yet to compile evidence strong enough to back up publicly their claims that Iran is fomenting violence against U.S. troops in Iraq.

On 12 February 2007, US administration organized a briefing in Bagdad to make their case. Journalists were told that the use of the deadliest form of roadside bomb known as EFP's – explosively formed penetrators – had nearly doubled last year. They were said there was a "growing body of evidence pointing to Iranian supply of EFPs to Iraqi extremist groups".

"They condemn us for making problems in Iraq, but they don't have any documentary proof," Iran Foreign Ministry spokesman Mohammad Ali Hossaini told reporters. "Lots of this evidence is fake, artificial. For example, when they wanted to start a war in Iraq, they made plenty of evidence that there were lots of weapons in Iraq, though the investigators of the International Atomic Energy Agency said they couldn't find any weapons in Iraq," he said. "Right now they're using weapons [with certain markings], but it doesn't prove where these weapons came from.

Iranian envoy kidnapped by Iraqi gunmen

Iraqi gunmen dressed in military uniforms kidnapped the second secretary of the Iranian embassy, Jalal Sharafi, on February 4, 2007 as he drove through central Baghdad. One official of the Iraqi government stated that the abduction occurred at the hands of a special army unit that reports directly to the US military command, but this was denied by American military officials. Iran's Foreign Ministry has condemned the kidnapping and pinned the blame on the US.

Economic sanctions against Iran

Since the 1979 revolution in Iran, the country has been under constant US unilateral sanctions. The first U.S. sanctions against Iran were formalized in November 1979, and during the hostage crisis, many sanctions were leveled against the Iranian government. By 1987 the import of Iranian goods into the United States had been banned. In 1995, President Clinton issued Executive Order 12957, banning U.S. investment in Iran's energy sector, followed a few weeks later by Executive Order 12959 of May 9, 1995, eliminating all trade and investment and virtually all interaction between the United States and Iran. For details of current US sanctions, see the page of US Treasury .

The United States have not been followed yet by other countries. But the UN sanctions are the first international sanctions levied on Iran. The United States is pushing for more economic sanctions against Iran. Under a proposal by Germany, which holds the EU presidency during the first semester of 2007, the European Union is also considering imposing sanctions that go beyond the UN sanctions but has not made any decision yet.

In June 2007 leading EU countries including Britain, France and Germany cautioned Iran that it faces further sanctions for expanding uranium enrichment and curbing U.N. inspectors' access to its nuclear program. "Iran continues to ignore its obligations and has not taken any steps to build confidence in the exclusively peaceful nature of its program". Additionally, the EU offers Iran suspension of sanctions and a package of trade and industrial benefits if it suspends its nuclear program.

The Iran Sanctions Enhancement Act of 2007, introduced by Representative Mark Kirk, Republican–IL, and Representative Rob Andrews, Democrat-New Jersey, would threaten sanctions against any company or individual that provides Iran with refined petroleum products or engages in an activity that could contribute to the enhancement of Iran's ability to import refined products after December 31. The bill could potentially lead to sanctions against gasoline brokers, tankers and insurers.

Alleged preparation for a war
United States and Israel have refused to exclude the use of force to stop the Iranian nuclear program. They have, however, always stressed that they consider the use of force as a last resort.

Starting in 2005, several analysts, including journalist Seymour Hersh, former UN weapons of mass destruction inspector in Iraq from 1991 to 1998, Scott Ritter, Joseph Cirincione, director for non-proliferation at the Carnegie Endowment for International Peace, Professor at the University of San Francisco and Middle East editor for the Foreign Policy in Focus Project, …

Dec 19, 2006: According to CBS News report, the Pentagon is planning to bolster its presence in the Persian Gulf as a warning to Iran's continuously defiant government. CBS News national security correspondent David Martin says the U.S. military build-up, which would include adding a second aircraft carrier to the one already in the Gulf, is being proposed as a response to what U.S. officials view as an increasingly provocative Iranian leadership.

Dec 22, 2006: US Defense Secretary Robert Gates said that an increased US naval presence in the Persian Gulf is not a response to any action by Iran but a message that the United States will keep and maintain its regional footprint "for a long time."

Jan 6, 2007, a news agency reported that Israeli military sources had revealed a plan to strike the enrichment plant at Natanz using low-yield nuclear "bunker-busters."  The disclosure may have been done to increase pressure on Iran to cease enrichment activities. The Israeli government denied this report. In Tehran, Iran's Foreign Ministry spokesman Mohammad Ali Hosseini told a news conference that the newspaper report "will make clear to the world public opinion that the Zionist regime is the main menace to global peace and the region." He said "any measure against Iran will not be left without a response and the invader will regret its act immediately.".

Jan 11, 2007: Administration officials said that the battle group would be stationed within quick sailing distance of Iran, a response to the growing concern that Iran is building up its own missile capacity and naval power, with the goal of military dominance in the Gulf.

Jan 12, 2007: President Bush accused Iran in a speech this week of helping launch attacks against U.S. troops in Iraq. His remarks were followed by combative comments from his top war advisors, new moves by U.S. naval forces and a raid Thursday in the Kurdish-controlled city of Irbil. The administration moved Friday 12 January to defuse concerns that it was planning or inviting a confrontation with Tehran. At a news conference, White House Press Secretary Tony Snow dismissed as an "urban legend" suggestions that the United States was preparing for another war. Similar denials were issued by Defense Secretary Robert M. Gates and Marine Gen. Peter Pace, chairman of the Joint Chiefs of Staff.

Jan 14, 2007: A former Russian Black Sea Fleet Commander, Admiral Edward Baltin, says he believes the presence of so many US nuclear submarines in the Persian Gulf meant a strike was likely.

Jan 24, 2007: Iranian officials said Wednesday that they had received a delivery of advanced Russian air defense systems that are designed to protect its nuclear facilities at Isfahan, Bushehr, Tehran, and eastern Iran from attack, primarily from Israeli or American aircraft.

Feb 18, 2007: According to Scott Ritter, who reiterated his view that Iran will be attacked by Feb 18, 2007: According to Scott Ritter, who reiterated his view that Iran will be attacked by the US, the Pentagon has negotiated basing rights in Romania and Bulgaria so that B-1 and B-2 bombers can operate out of airfields there.

Jul 6, 2009: It was reported that Joe Biden gave a green light to Israel for a military attack on Iran,
however it was a misunderstanding, no green light was given to attack.

Opposition to a possible war

Organized opposition to a possible future military attack against Iran by the United States (US) is known to have started during 2005–2006. Beginning in early 2005, journalists, activists, and academics such as Seymour Hersh, Scott Ritter, Joseph Cirincione, and Jorge E. Hirsch began publishing claims that American concerns over the alleged threat posed by Iran's nuclear program might lead the US government to take military action against that country in the future. These reports, and the concurrent escalation of tensions between Iran and some Western governments, prompted the formation of grassroots organisations, including Campaign Against Sanctions and Military Intervention in Iran in the US and the United Kingdom, to advocate against potential military strikes on Iran. Additionally, several organizations and individuals, including the Director-General of the International Atomic Energy Agency, Mohamed ElBaradei, a former United Nations weapons inspector in Iraq, Scott Ritter, the Non-Aligned Movement of 118 states, and the Arab League, have publicly stated their opposition to a would-be attack on Iran.

See also

 Anti-Iranian sentiment
 Energy policy of the United States
 iBRIDGES
 Iran Sanctions Enhancement Act of 2007
 Iran–Israel relations
 Iran–United States relations
 United Nations Security Council Resolution 1747
 Iran Action Group
 Academic relations between Iran and the United States
 United States Cultural Diplomacy in Iran

References

 
Politics of Iran
History of the Persian Gulf
2006 in Iran
Nuclear program of Iran
Sanctions against Iran
Aftermath of the Iranian Revolution